Taikat (Tajkat) or Arso is a Papuan language of Indonesian Papua.

Phonology
Taikat has six vowels, /a e i o u ə/.

References

Border languages (New Guinea)
Languages of western New Guinea